The oldest human settlement site in Central California is located in Scotts Valley, California, when it was the shore of a large Pleistocene lake. Archaeological findings from 1983 and 1987 support dates as old as 9-12,000 years, based on carbon dates, geological context, and artifact styles, such as eccentrics (or crescents) stone tools and large leaf style projectile points.

History 
This ancient settlement (CA-SCR-177) was first recorded in 1978. and later tested in 1980 by Archaeological Research Management. A report was delivered to the Scotts Valley City Council in 1980. The Council disregarded the report and the Mayor, Friend Stone directed the attempted destruction of the site. After appeals by the Santa Cruz Archaeological Society were ignored by the Council, the Society sued (Nov. 1981) to have the Cultural Resource Materials considered under CEQA (California Environmental Quality Act). In Nov. 1982, in an out- of-court settlement, the City of Scotts Valley agreed to change their planning procedures to consider cultural resources more fully in the future, and to fund (via the Society) efforts to document and expand the archaeological sample in the damaged areas to see if the age and significance of the site as stated in the 1981 report were supported.

Excavations 
The Santa Cruz Archaeological Society organized for Memorial Day weekend, 1983, what would turn out to be the largest volunteer excavation crew ever assembled for such an occasion. This work supported the previous research and led the City of Scotts Valley to have to fund a large excavation in 1987 as the project development plans were changed.

These volunteer excavations produced artifacts and other data that supported the previous research; including a chert crescent tool and a leaf-shaped chert biface that supported an estimated date of 7-10,000 YBP, and a metate feature, which is one of the oldest dated examples of ground-stone in California.

Analysis and post-excavation research 
Many scholars were involved in the analysis of the over 13,000 stone tools, artifacts and ecofacts from both the 1983 and 1987 excavations under the coordination of Dr. Robert Cartier. The final monograph was published by the Santa Cruz Archaeological Society and A.R.M. There was a display at City Hall created by A.R.M. Artifacts that were discovered in both excavations were later curated at UC Santa Cruz.

The monograph reported on the extensive analyses done that related both to the findings in time (back 12,000 years) and space (to previous archaeological findings in Western North America). A series of chapters, written by various scholars, includes careful examination of the history of what produced the excavation, how the volunteer excavation was carried out, and the analysis of the various data generated from both the 1983 and 1987 excavations.

The findings concluded that based on the thirty-seven radio carbon dates, the seventy-two obsidian hydration readings, the well-dated stratigraphic profile, and the diagnostic style of the artifacts that all data supported the 7 to 12,000-year-old antiquity of CA-SCR-177.

Cartier notes in his concluding comments:
"the exceptional character of the Scotts Valley site lies in its well-documented antiquity, its long duration of occupation...and the relative integrity of its site structure".
"few archaeological sites known of this antiquity with this degree of dating".
While its occupation seems to have been episodic, it "contains one of the longest records of human occupation yet known (as of 1993) for western North America".

Archaeologist Gerrit Fenenga, in his chapter in the monograph, adds, "The Scotts Valley Site is clearly of great significance locally, regionally, statewide and in North America".

Subsequent archaeological research ties the Scotts Valley site technology to the "Western Pluvial Lake Tradition which dates to the 12.000 to 7,000 ybp. Recent research at the Sudden Flats site along the Central California coast documents a similar technology and proposes three different lithic technology traditions which may relate to different group migrating groups down the Coast in that era.

References 

 

Archaeological sites in California
History of Santa Cruz County, California
Native American history of California